Jeffrey Bawden (13 January 1924 – 5 March 2006) was an English rugby league footballer who played in the 1940s and 1950s, and coached in the 1950s.

Background
Jeff Bawden was born in Whitehaven, Cumberland, England, and he died in Whitehaven, Cumbria, England.

Playing career
As a teenager, Bawden also played rugby union, and represented England rugby union schoolboys at the age of 13. He was also a talented footballer, and turned down an offer to trial with Wolverhampton Wanderers shortly before joining Huddersfield.

Bawden spent his entire professional career with Huddersfield, appearing 243 times for the club between 1943 and 1952. He also represented Cumberland on 14 occasions. Jeff Bawden played left-, i.e. number 4, and scored a conversion in Cumberland's 5-4 victory over Australia in the 1948–49 Kangaroo tour of Great Britain and France match at the Recreation Ground, Whitehaven on Wednesday 13 October 1948, in front of a crowd of 8,818. Bawden played right-, i.e. number 3, and scored 3-conversions in Huddersfield's 4-11 defeat by Bradford Northern in the 1949–50 Yorkshire County Cup Final during the 1949–50 season at Headingley Rugby Stadium, Leeds on Saturday 29 October 1949. After retiring from playing, he returned to his hometown, and held various non-playing roles at Whitehaven, including a spell as head coach.

In 1999, Bawden was inducted into Huddersfield's Hall of Fame.

References

1924 births
2006 deaths
Cumberland rugby league team players
English rugby league coaches
English rugby league players
Huddersfield Giants players
Rugby league centres
Rugby league players from Whitehaven
Rugby league wingers
Whitehaven R.L.F.C. coaches